John Lloyd (184710/17 June 1915) was a British Anglican bishop. He served as the Bishop of Swansea (a suffragan bishop in the Diocese of St David's) from 1890 until his death in office.

Lloyd was the son of William Lloyd of Newport, Monmouthshire, and was educated at Sidney Sussex College, Cambridge — whence he was awarded his Bachelor of Arts (BA) degree in 1876, his Cambridge Master of Arts (MA Cantab) in 1888, and a Doctorate of Divinity in 1891. He married in 1883.

Made a deacon in London in 1876, he at first served as curate of Roehampton, Surrey; he was ordained priest in 1877 and became curate of Storrington, West Sussex. He served as vicar of St Peter's Church, Carmarthen from 1889, then a canon residentiary of St David's Cathedral from 1890; he became vicar of Jeffreston and Reynalton, Pembrokeshire, in 1900 and vicar of Lampeter, Cardiganshire, in 1903.

Nominated to serve as the first Bishop of Swansea — to assist the Bishop of St David's —, Lloyd was ordained and consecrated a bishop on 24 June 1890, by Edward White Benson, Archbishop of Canterbury, at St Paul's Cathedral, and was sworn in on St Peter's day (29 June) 1890.

References

1847 births
Alumni of Sidney Sussex College, Cambridge
Bishops of Swansea
19th-century Welsh Anglican bishops
20th-century Welsh Anglican bishops
1915 deaths
People from Storrington